Nelson Land District is a land district (cadastral division) of Western Australia, located within the South West Division on the state's south coast. It covers part of the state's Lower South West region and includes the townsites of Bridgetown, Manjimup, Pemberton, Northcliffe and Nannup as well as Point D'Entrecasteaux and, at its far southeastern corner, Walpole (the Frankland River is its boundary at this point).

History
The system of land districts came together in an ad hoc fashion, and the Nelson district started to be subdivided in 1858 well before any thought was given to formally defining its boundaries.

Towns and areas

Towns
The Nelson district contains the following current or former townsites:

Agricultural areas
Under the Land Act 1898, the Agricultural Lands Purchase Act 1896, and preceding regulations, it was open to the Governor to declare agricultural areas on crown land or repurchased estates on private land, to which special provisions applied for both alienation and improvement. Many of these estates came into being shortly after World War I for the purposes of soldier resettlement.

References

Land districts of Western Australia